Keshia Grant (born 11 January 1987 in Tauranga, New Zealand) is a New Zealand netball player.

Biography
Grant played netball in the netball ANZ Championship, for the Waikato Bay of Plenty Magic in 2008, the Northern Mystics from 2009 to 2011, and the Canterbury/Mainland Tactix from 2012 to 2015.

Grant was also a successful javelin thrower in New Zealand winning the event at the New Zealand Athletics Championships in three consecutive years, 2007 to 2009. Grant was ranked second in the New Zealand all-time rankings in 2010 and was still ranked in the top ten in 2019.

References

External links
2009 ANZ Championship profile

New Zealand netball players
Mainland Tactix players
Northern Mystics players
Waikato Bay of Plenty Magic players
Sportspeople from Tauranga
1987 births
Living people
ANZ Championship players
Mavericks netball players
New Zealand expatriate netball people in England